Briann January (born January 11, 1987) is a former American professional basketball player for the Women's National Basketball Association (WNBA) and current assistant coach for the Connecticut Sun. After a successful college career at Arizona State University, January was drafted by the Indiana Fever with the sixth overall pick in the 2009 WNBA draft. She has also played for the Phoenix Mercury, the Connecticut Sun, and the Seattle Storm.

Personal life
Briann Jolie January was born in Spokane, Washington on January 11, 1987, the daughter of Barry, a karate instructor, and Sally, a teacher. She has an older sister, Aleisha (Anderson), brother-in-law Calvin, and a younger sister, Kiara. She also has a niece, Leilani and two nephews, Caiden and Cord’e. January holds a black belt in karate.

High school
January was a 2005 graduate of Lewis and Clark High School in Spokane, Washington, earning first-team all-state honors by both the Associated Press and the Seattle Times. January served as a team captain in track and field as a senior. She won the state high jump title in 2004, with her personal best in the high jump being 5–8. Led Lewis and Clark to a 25–3 record and an appearance in the state semifinals as a senior, averaging 13 points a game in her final season, and was team MVP and assists leader in each of her four seasons.

College career
January attended Arizona State University for four seasons. As a freshman, January was named to the Pac-10's 2006 All-Freshman Team after a season in which she finished first on the team in both assists (86) and steals (46). The 86 assists represented the second-highest total ever for a Sun Devil freshman. When January was a sophomore she earned All-Pac-10 Honorable Mention honors for a season in which she finished No. 3 in the Pac-10 in steals (2.1 per game), No. 4 in assists (4.0 per game), No. 4 in assist-to-turnover ratio (1.67) and No. 6 in free throw percentage (81.7). In her final season as a Sun Devil, January set the school's single-season record for 3-point field goals (65). She also tied the school's single-game record with seven 3-pointers in ASU's win at UC Davis on December 3. After four seasons as a Sun Devil, January is the only player in school history to lead the team in steals and assists four straight years.

Entering her senior season at Arizona State in 2008, January appeared on a regional cover of Sports Illustrated with fellow Sun Devil and future NBA star James Harden.

College statistics
Source

WNBA career
January was drafted with the 6th overall pick in the 2009 WNBA Draft by the Indiana Fever. As a rookie in the WNBA, January came off the bench, playing 33 games with 4 starts while averaging 6.9 points per game for the Fever. January also experienced her first WNBA finals appearance in her rookie season with the Fever, who were led by Tamika Catchings and Katie Douglas advanced all the way to the 2009 WNBA Finals where they lost 3-2 to the Phoenix Mercury. En route to the finals, January was able to provide an offensive spark off the bench for the Fever during the playoffs, averaging 10.6 points per game in 10 games. 

In the 2011 season, January officially became the starting point guard for the Fever, but after playing only 10 games, she was sidelined for the rest of the season with a torn ACL. 

In 2012, January came back healthy and averaged a career-high 10.3 points per game. She was the Fever's third-leading scorer on the roster that would eventually win the WNBA Championship, they had defeated the championship-defending Minnesota Lynx 3-1 in the finals. 

In 2014, January was named a WNBA All-Star for the first time in her career, she had tied her career-high in scoring average for the whole season. 

In 2015, January was shooting a career-high in both field goal and 3-point percentage. The Fever advanced to the finals for the second time in four years. They had once again faced the Minnesota Lynx but lost the series in five games. 

In 2016 and 2017, January would be named to first and second all-defensive team respectively.

After nine seasons played with the Fever, January was traded to the Phoenix Mercury in exchange for a top-10 draft pick in March 2018. In 2018, January would be the starting point guard for the Mercury, joining Diana Taurasi in the backcourt. She would put a new career-high in 3-point percentage while leading the league in that category. The Mercury finished 20-14 with the number 5 seed in the league. They would defeat the Dallas Wings in the first round elimination game 101-83. In the second round elimination game, the Mercury defeated the Connecticut Sun 96-86. In the semi-finals, the Mercury lost in five games to the Seattle Storm.

In 2019, January re-signed with the Mercury to a multi-year deal. On July 10, 2019, January scored a season-high 18 points in a 91-68 victory against the Washington Mystics. The Mercury finished as the number 8 seed with a 15-19 record. The Mercury were eliminated in the first round elimination game 105-76 by the Chicago Sky.

Overseas career
For the 2009–10 off-season, January played in Turkey for Tarsus Belediyes. In the 2010–11 off-season, January played in Israel for Raanana Hertzeliya. In the 2012–13 off-season, January played in Israel once again for Elektra Ramat Hasharon. In the 2013–14 off-season, January played in Brazil for Maranhao Basquete. In the 2014–15 off-season, January played in Turkey once again for Adana ASKİ SK. In July 2016, January signed with Adana ASKİ SK for a second stint during the 2016–17 off-season. In 2019, January signed with Sopron Basket of the Hungarian League for the 2019-20 off-season.

Coaching career
January spent the 2013–14 off-season as a volunteer assistant coach for the Adelphi University women's basketball program. With January's help, the team advanced to the NCAA tournament as a #2 seed, after losing 48 games over the previous 3 seasons. In August 2017, it was announced that January would be the assistant coach for Arizona State's women's basketball team during the off-season.

January returned to the coaching world when the Connecticut Sun announced her as a new assistant coach for Stephanie White's staff on January 3, 2023.

WNBA statistics

Regular season

|-
| style="text-align:left;"| 2009
| style="text-align:left;"| Indiana
| 33 || 4 || 20.7 || .333 || .287 || .851 || 1.9 || 2.3 || 1.0 || 0.0 || 1.7 || 6.9
|-
| style="text-align:left;"| 2010
| style="text-align:left;"| Indiana
| 30  || 7  || 21.9 || .371 || .356 || .826 || 2.0 || 3.1 || 1.2 || 0.1 || 2.2 || 7.4
|-
| style="text-align:left;"| 2011
| style="text-align:left;"| Indiana
| 10 || 10 ||28.6||.357||.318||.829|| 1.4 || 5.0 || 1.5 || 0.0 || 3.3 || 8.6
|-
|style="text-align:left;background:#afe6ba;"|   2012†
| style="text-align:left;"| Indiana
| 31 || 26 || 28.4 ||.404 ||.430 || .874 || 1.8 || 3.9 || 1.1 || 0.1 || 2.4 || 10.3
|-
| style="text-align:left;"| 2013
| style="text-align:left;"| Indiana
| 32 || 32 ||29.6||.348 ||.357 ||.811 || 2.4 || 3.7  || 1.0 || 0.1  || 2.4 || 9.8
|-
| style="text-align:left;"| 2014
| style="text-align:left;"| Indiana
| 31 || 31 ||28.9||.387 ||.383 ||.880 || 1.6 || 3.7 || 1.2 || 0.2 || 2.2 || 10.3
|-
| style="text-align:left;"| 2015
| style="text-align:left;"| Indiana
| 29 || 29 ||27.0||.426 ||style="background:#D3D3D3"|.431° ||.845 || 1.8 || 3.4 || 1.0 || 0.2  || 2.1 || 8.1
|-
| style="text-align:left;"| 2016
| style="text-align:left;"| Indiana
| 29 || 27 ||28.1||.401 ||.392 ||.875 || 1.8 || 4.7 || 1.2 || 0.1 || 1.7 || 9.7
|-
| style="text-align:left;"| 2017
| style="text-align:left;"| Indiana
| 25 || 24 ||26.3||.395||.316 ||.817 || 1.5 || 3.9 || 0.9 || 0.1 || 2.1 || 9.5
|-
| style="text-align:left;"| 2018
| style="text-align:left;"| Phoenix
| 33 || 33 ||27.1||.423||style="background:#D3D3D3"|.470°||.806 || 2.1 || 3.3 || 0.5 || 0.1 || 1.4 || 7.0
|-
| style="text-align:left;"| 2019
| style="text-align:left;"| Phoenix
| 32 || 26 ||26.6|| .390 || .378 ||.836 || 1.3 || 3.3 || 0.8 || 0.0 || 1.6 || 6.5
|-
| style="text-align:left;"| 2020
| style="text-align:left;"| Connecticut
| 33 || 13 || 23.3 || .293 || .355 || .833 || 1.2 || 3.4 || 0.6 || 0.2 || 1.2 || 5.0
|-
| style="text-align:left;"| 2021
| style="text-align:left;"| Connecticut
| 29 || 29 || 30.2 || .425 || .380 || .868 || 1.4 || 3.1 || 0.9 || 0.1 || 1.8 || 7.0
|-
| style="text-align:left;"| 2022
| style="text-align:left;"| Seattle
| 36 || 5 || 16.9 || .377 || .311 || .826 || 1.0 || 2.4 || 0.6 || 0.2 || 1.5 || 3.7
|-
| style="text-align:left;"| Career
| style="text-align:left;"|14 years, 4 teams
| 393 || 293 || 25.8 || .385 || .376 || .845 || 1.7 || 3.4 || 1.0 || 0.1 || 2.0 || 7.8

Playoffs

|-
| style="text-align:left;"| 2009
| style="text-align:left;"| Indiana
| 10 || 0 || 38.5 || .385 || .414 || .850 || 2.4 || 3.0 || 0.4 || 0.0 || 1.3|| 10.6
|-
| style="text-align:left;"| 2010
| style="text-align:left;"| Indiana
| 3 || 0 || 19.7 || .313 || .200 || .900 || 1.3 || 2.0 || 0.3 || 0.0 || 2.6 || 6.7
|-
|style="text-align:left;background:#afe6ba;"|   2012†
| style="text-align:left;"| Indiana
| 10 || 10 || 34.1 || .426|| .227 || .900 || 2.3 || 3.8 || 1.6 || 0.3 || 3.0 || 11.5
|-
| style="text-align:left;"| 2013
| style="text-align:left;"| Indiana
| 4||4||29.6||.370 ||.444|| .857 || 2.8 || 3.5 || 0.5 || 0.0 || 2.0 ||7.5
|-
| style="text-align:left;"| 2014
| style="text-align:left;"| Indiana
| 5||5||35.2||.322||.353||.833||2.8||4.2||1.2||0.8||2.0||12.8
|-
| style="text-align:left;"| 2015
| style="text-align:left;"| Indiana
| 11||11||32.2||.407||.286||.933 ||2.3||5.0||1.3||0.2||2.7||11.3
|-
| style="text-align:left;"| 2016
| style="text-align:left;"| Indiana
| 1||1||33.3||.308||.000||.667||0.0||9.0||3.0||0.0||1.0||12.0
|-
| style="text-align:left;"| 2018
| style="text-align:left;"| Phoenix
| 7||7||35.4||.352||.276||.667||2.9||3.7||0.7||0.0||1.0||7.1
|-
| style="text-align:left;"| 2019
| style="text-align:left;"| Phoenix
| 1||1||26.4||.429||.000|| 1.000||2.0||2.0||1.0||0.0||3.0||12.0
|-
| style="text-align:left;"| 2020
| style="text-align:left;"| Connecticut
| 7 || 7 || 32.6 || .347 || .345 || 1.000 || 1.9 || 3.6 || 0.9 || 0.0 || 0.9 || 9.0
|-
| style="text-align:left;"| 2021
| style="text-align:left;"| Connecticut
| 3 || 3 || 34.0 || .529 || .625 || .676 || 2.3 || 3.0 || 1.0 || 0.0 || 1.7 || 10.7
|-
| style="text-align:left;"| 2022
| style="text-align:left;"| Seattle
| 6 || 0 || 7.2 || .500 || .00 || .00 || 0.5 || 1.2 || 0.0 || 0.0 || 0.7 || 1.0
|-
| style="text-align:left;"| Career
| style="text-align:left;"| 12 years, 4 teams
| 68 || 49 || 28.7 || .384 || .324 || .855 || 2.2 || 3.6 || 0.9 || 0.2 || 1.8 || 9.3

References

External links

1987 births
Living people
American expatriate basketball people in Brazil
American expatriate basketball people in Israel
American expatriate basketball people in Turkey
American women's basketball coaches
American women's basketball players
Arizona State Sun Devils women's basketball players
Basketball players from Spokane, Washington
Connecticut Sun players
Connecticut Sun coaches
Indiana Fever draft picks
Indiana Fever players
LGBT basketball players
LGBT people from Washington (state)
Lesbian sportswomen
Phoenix Mercury players
Point guards
Women's National Basketball Association All-Stars